South Korean entertainer Rain has released seven studio albums, one compilation album, three extended plays, and thirty-three singles.

Albums

Studio albums

Reissues

Compilation albums

Extended plays

Singles

As lead artist

Other charted songs

Other appearances

Album appearances

Soundtrack appearances

Videography

Concert tour videos

Music video compilations

Documentaries

Music videos

Notes

References

Discographies of South Korean artists
Pop music discographies
Rhythm and blues discographies
Rain (entertainer)